The Los Angeles Board of Police Commissioners, also commonly known as the Los Angeles Police Commission, is a five-member body of civilian-only, appointed officials which oversees the Los Angeles Police Department.

Organization
The board is made up of five members who are appointed by the mayor and confirmed by the City Council. Each member serves a five-year term with a maximum of two terms.

The Los Angeles Police Commission also includes the Office of the Executive Director, Office of the Inspector General, Commission Investigation Division, and the Police Permit Review Panel.

Members
Eileen M. Decker, president, former U.S. attorney
Steve Soboroff, commissioner, commercial real-estate developer
Maria Lou Calanche, commissioner, founder and executive director of youth development organization Legacy LA
Dale Bonner, commissioner, executive chairman of Plenary Concessions
William Briggs II, commissioner, attorney

Responsibilities
The Board of Police Commissioners is the collective head of the Los Angeles Police Department. It sets the overall policy while the Chief of Police manages the daily operations of the department and implements the board's policies and goals. The board meets every Tuesday in a public hearing room at police headquarters where the public may comment on the matters at hand as well as address the board directly.

References

External links 
Los Angeles Board of Police Commissioners

Police oversight organizations
Government watchdog groups in the United States